The River Derwent is a river which flows between the historic county boundaries of Durham and Northumberland in the north east of England. It broadens into the Derwent Reservoir, west of Consett.  The Derwent is a tributary of the River Tyne, which it joins near the MetroCentre near Gateshead. The river flows for 35 miles from its origin, where two streams, Beldon Burn and Nookton Burn meet approximately a mile west of Blanchland, to Derwenthaugh where it flows into the River Tyne. On its journey, the river flows through places such as Allensford, Shotley Bridge, Blackhall Mill and Rowlands Gill. The Derwent Walk Country Park  at Rowlands Gill is named after the river.

The name Derwent comes from the Brythonic/Early Welsh word for oak derw and valley -went.

References

External links
 
 Derwent Photographs
 Bridges On The Derwent

Rivers of County Durham
Rivers of Northumberland
Rivers of Tyne and Wear
1Derwent